Carsten Svensgaard (born 3 January 1975 in Holstebro, Denmark) is a Danish curler, a three-time  and a five-time Danish men's champion.

He participated at the 2002 Winter Olympics where the Danish men's team finished in seventh place.

Teams

References

External links
 
 

Living people
1975 births
People from Holstebro
Curlers at the 2002 Winter Olympics
Olympic curlers of Denmark
Danish male curlers
Danish curling champions
Sportspeople from the Central Denmark Region
21st-century Danish people